My Love from the Star is a 2017 Philippine television drama comedy romantic fantasy series broadcast by GMA Network. The series is based on a 2013 South Korean television series of the same title. Directed by Joyce E. Bernal, it stars Jennylyn Mercado and Gil Cuerva. It premiered on May 29, 2017 on the network's Telebabad line up replacing Destined to be Yours. The series concluded on August 11, 2017 with a total of 55 episodes. It was replaced by Mulawin vs. Ravena in its timeslot.

The series is streaming online on YouTube.

Premise 
400 years ago, Matteo's spaceship crash landed on Earth. Since then, he lives on Earth while eagerly waiting for beings from his planet to take him back home. Three months before his expected departure from Earth, he encounters Steffi. At first, they don't get along, but will eventually have feelings for one another and fall in love.

Cast and characters

Lead cast
 Jennylyn Mercado as Steffanie Elaine "Steffi" Chavez
 Gil Cuerva as Matteo Domingo

Supporting cast
 Gabby Eigenmann as Jackson Libredo
 Christian Bautista as Winston Libredo
 Jackie Rice as Lucy Yuzon
 Rhian Ramos as Rachel Andrada
 Glydel Mercado as Elena "Lynelle" Chavez 
 Melissa Mendez as Doris Yuzon
 Spanky Manikan and Crispin Pineda as Juan "Mr. Jang" Avanado
 Renz Fernandez as Peter Yuzon
 Migo Adecer as Yuan Federico Chavez
 Nar Cabico as Jun
 Analyn Barro as Mina 
 Valentin as Ricardo Park
 Moi Bien as Kathy

Guest cast
 Pauline Mendoza as Marcella Infante / teen Steffi
 Arrel Mendoza as Dominic Antonio
 Lope Juban as Ronaldo Libredo 
 Lynn Ynchausti-Cruz as Loreta Libredo 
 Ken Alfonso as Lester Hernandez
 Alvin Ronquillo as Pato
 Ashley Mendoza as Jeto
 Martin Buen as Evan 
 Princess Guevarra as Jennifer Abuzo
 Lao Rodriguez as Rey 
 Renz Verano as Marlon "Minggo" Chavez
 Dianne Medina as Kristine "K" Libredo 
 Adrian Pascual as teen Winston
 Lindsay de Vera as teen Lucy
 Simon Ibarra as Arnaldo Infante
 Frances Makil-Ignacio as Leonora Infante
 Rolly Innocencio as Onat
 Maricris Garcia as Shanel Luz-Meneses
 Will Devaughn as Yugo Meneses
 Liezel Lopez as Juana Jimenez
 Ermie Concepcion as Maria Jimenez
 Dante Ponce as Ramon Perez
 Ces Aldaba as Cipriano
 Bryan Benedict as Pontenciano Infante
 Faith da Silva as Natasha Andrada
 Manuel Chua as Nick
 Joemarie Nielsen as young Mr. Jang
 Phytos Ramirez as Fidel Perez
 David Uy as Winston's doctor
 Barbie Forteza as a guest at the awards' night
 Ken Chan as a guest at the awards' night
 Jak Roberto as a guest at the awards' night
 Ivan Dorschner as a guest at the awards' night

Episodes

May 2017

June 2017

July 2017

August 2017

Production
On March 24, 2016, GMA Network announced that they have acquired the rights to remake the South Korean television series My Love from the Star. On April 19, 2016, Joyce E. Bernal said she would direct the television series, and Alden Richards would play the role of Matteo, originally played by actor Kim Soo-hyun. On July 4, 2016, Jennylyn Mercado was hired to play the role of Steffi, originally played by Jun Ji-hyun. While Richards was later announced not to appear in the series. On December 9, 2016, after conducting multiple auditions for the role of Matteo, Gil Cuerva was hired. The role of Doris was first offered to Alice Dixson which she turned down due to personal reasons. On July 6, 2017, Spanky Manikan was replaced by Crispin Pineda due to health reasons.

Ratings
According to AGB Nielsen Philippines' Nationwide Urban Television Audience Measurement people in television homes, the pilot episode of My Love from the Star earned an 11% rating. While the final episode scored an 8.8% rating. The series had its highest rating on June 1, 2016 with an 11.1% rating.

Accolades

References

External links
 
 

2017 Philippine television series debuts
2017 Philippine television series endings
Filipino-language television shows
GMA Network drama series
Philippine romantic comedy television series
Philippine television series based on South Korean television series
Television shows set in the Philippines